The Fuchs Group is a privately-owned spice company that does business globally. It was founded in 1952 by Dieter Fuchs in Dissen, Germany, where the company still has its headquarters.

Background
The North American headquarters is located in Hampstead, Maryland. Fuchs North America was formerly known as the Baltimore Spice Company, founded by Gustav Brunn, the company that was started for the production of Old Bay Seasoning.  The Old Bay product line was sold to McCormick & Company prior to Fuchs acquiring the rest of the Baltimore Spice business in 1990.

References

External links
 

Food and drink companies established in 1952
1952 establishments in West Germany
Multinational companies headquartered in Germany